Frederick Jones may refer to:
Frederick Edward Jones (1759–1834), Irish theatre manager
Frederick McKinley Jones (1893–1961), African-American inventor
Sir Frederick Jones, 1st Baronet (1854–1936)
Frederick Elwyn Jones, Baron Elwyn-Jones (1909–1989), British barrister and Labour politician
Frederic Jones (1832–1890), Canterbury, New Zealand politician
Frederic Jones (cricketer) (1850–1921), English cricketer
Frederick Jones (footballer) (1863–?), Welsh international footballer
Frederic Wood Jones (1879–1954), British anthropologist
Frederick Nelson Jones (1881–1962), New Zealand saddler, photographer, amusement park owner and inventor
Frederick S. Jones, American university professor, dean, and college football coach

See also
Fred Jones (disambiguation)